The Regiment "Lancieri di Firenze" (9th) ( - "Lancers of Florence") is an inactive cavalry unit of the Tuscan Army, French Army, Sardinian Army, and Italian Army.

History

Formation 

On 12 September 1753 the Corps of Tuscan Dragoons was formed in Florence by order of the Grand Duke of Tuscany Francis I, who had been bestowed with the Grand Duchy of Tuscany by his father in law Charles VI, Holy Roman Emperor in 1737. The crops consisted of two mounted and one dismounted squadron. The corps' strength was 307 men.

Napoleonic Wars 
On 2 November 1791 the corps was reduced by Grand Duke Ferdinand III to one mounted squadron. In 1799 the corps participated in the War of the Second Coalition and fought against troops of the French-allied Cisalpine Republic. After the Battle of Marengo French forces occupied Tuscany and Grand Duke Ferdinand III was forced to abandon his Italian possession. In 1801 the Treaty of Aranjuez dissolved the Grand Duchy of Tuscany, which was replaced by the Kingdom of Etruria under the rule of Louis I, who reduced the Corps of Tuscan Dragoons to a single company.

On 27 May 1803 Louis I died and was succeeded by his infant son, Charles Louis, under the regency of his mother, Queen María Luisa, who on 21 July 1803 ordered to form a Royal Corps of Dragoons. The corps consisted of four companies in two squadrons. The four companies were based at Florence, Siena, Pistoia, and Livorno. On 21 July 1805 the Queen María Luisa reduced the corps to two companies, which form the Tuscan Dragoons Squadron.

On 10 December 1807 Emperor Napoleon forced Queen María Luisa to abdicate and the Kingdom of Etruria came under French control. On 7 January 1808 the new authorities ordered to expand the Tuscan Dragoons Squadron to Tuscan Dragoons Regiment with two squadrons. On 29 May 1808 the formation of the regiment concluded. On 30 May 1808 the Kingdom of Etruria was annexed by the First French Empire and the regiment was integrated into the French Army. On 1 July 1809 the regiment was renamed 28e Régiment de Chasseurs à Cheval.

In 1808 the regiment served in Napoleon's invasion of Spain and remained in Spain until 1812. In 1811 the regiment fought in the Battle of Fuentes de Oñoro. In 1812 the regiment then left Spain to participate in the French invasion of Russia, during which the regiment fought in the battles of Smolensk, Borodino, Vyazma, Krasnoi, and Berezina. In 1813-14 the regiment participated in the German campaign, fighting in the Battle of the Göhrde and in the Siege of Hamburg. Shortly after Napoleon abdicated the throne on 11 April 1814 the 28e Régiment de Chasseurs à Cheval was disbanded.

Restauration 
In 1814 the Grand Duchy of Tuscany was restored and Grand Duke Ferdinand III resumed his rule. The same year the Royal Corps of Dragoons is reformed. On 21 January 1816 the corps was transferred to the light cavalry and renamed Corps of Mounted Hunters, which consisted of four squadrons. On 18 June 1824 Ferdinand III died and was succeeded by his son Leopold II as Grand Duke.

Italian unification 
In 1848-49 the First Italian War of Independence between the Kingdom of Sardinia and the Austrian Empire was fought in northern Italy. Leopold II sided with Sardinia and two squadrons of the Corps of Mounted Hunters participated in the war on the Sardinian side. The two squadrons fought and at the Battle of Curtatone and Montanara and at the Battle of Goito. In August 1848 the corps was equipped with lances.

On 26 April 1859 the Second Italian War of Independence broke out and two days later Leopold II left Tuscany, which was quickly occupied by Sardinian troops. The corps was renamed Tuscan Dragoons Regiment and two of its squadrons participated in the war of the side Sardinian side, while the other two squadrons remained in Tuscany. The Armistice of Villafranca allowed Leopold II to return to Tuscany, but the Tuscan National Assembly deposed the House of Habsburg-Lorraine on 16 August 1859.

On 14 November 1859 the regiment was renamed Regiment "Cavalleggeri di Firenze". On 8 December 1859 the Grand Duchy of Tuscany, Duchy of Parma, Duchy of Modena and the Papal Legations were merged into the United Provinces of Central Italy, which on 22 March 1860 were annexed by the Kingdom of Sardinia. On 26 March 1860 the Regiment "Cavalleggeri di Firenze" became the only regiment from a pre-unification state to be integrated into the Royal Sardinian Army.

On 6 June 1860 the regiment became a Lancer unit and was renamed Regiment "Lancieri di Firenze". In 1866 the regiment participated in the Third Italian War of Independence, during which it earned a Bronze Medal of Military Valour in the Battle of Ponte di Versa on 26 July 1866. In 1868-69 the regiment operated in the Abruzzo and Molise regions to suppress the anti-Sardinian revolt in Southern Italy after the Kingdom of Sardinia had invaded and annexed the Kingdom of Two Sicilies. Over the next years the regiment repeatedly changed its name:

 10 September 1871: 9th Regiment of Cavalry (Firenze)
 5 November 1876: Cavalry Regiment "Firenze" (9th)
 16 December 1897: Regiment "Lancieri di Firenze" (9th)

In 1887 the regiment contributed to the formation of the Mounted Hunters Squadron, which fought in the Italo-Ethiopian War of 1887–1889. In 1895-96 the regiment provided 2 officers and 70 enlisted for units deployed to Italian Eritrea for the First Italo-Ethiopian War. Between its founding and World War I the Firenze ceded on two occasions one of its squadrons to help form new regiments:

 16 February 1864: Regiment "Lancieri di Foggia" (later renamed: Regiment "Cavalleggeri di Foggia" 11th))
 1 October 1909: Regiment "Lancieri di Mantova" (25th)

In 1911 the regiment was transferred to Libya for the Italo-Turkish War. There the regiment fought in the Battles of Zanzur and in the Battle of Sidi Bilal.

World War I 
At the outbreak of World War I the regiment consisted of a command, the regimental depot, and two cavalry groups, with the I Group consisting of three squadrons and the II Group consisting of two squadrons and a machine gun section. The regiment fought dismounted in the trenches of the Italian Front. In 1917 the regimental depot in Rome formed the 1498th Dismounted Machine Gunners Company as reinforcement for infantry units on the front. In 1918 the regiment earned its second Bronze Medal of Military Valour for its conduct during the decisive Battle of Vittorio Veneto.

Interwar years 
After the war the Italian Army disbanded 14 of its 30 cavalry regiments and so on 21 November 1919 the II Group of the Firenze was renamed "Cavalleggeri di Palermo" as it consisted of personnel and horses from the disbanded Regiment "Cavalleggeri di Palermo" (30th). On 20 May 1920 the Firenze transferred one of its squadrons to the Regiment "Piemonte Reale Cavalleria" (2nd) and moved from Rome to Naples, where it took over the barracks of the disbanded Regiment "Cavalleggeri di Lodi" (15th). On the same date the Firenze lost its lances, was renamed Regiment "Cavalleggeri di Firenze" and received and integrated two squadrons of the "Cavalleggeri di Lodi". On the same date the Firenze also received the traditions of the regiments "Cavalleggeri di Lodi" (15th), "Cavalleggeri di Udine" (29th), and "Cavalleggeri di Palermo" (30th), as well as the traditions of the X Sardinian Group.

In 1925 the regiment moved from Naples to Ferrara. On 8 February 1934 the regiment was renamed Regiment "Lancieri di Firenze". In 1935-36 the regiment contributed one officer and 540 enlisted for units, which were deployed to East Africa for the Second Italo-Ethiopian War.

World War II 

At the outbreak of World War II the regiment consisted of a command, a command squadron, the I and II squadrons groups, each with two mounted squadrons, and the 5th Machine Gunners Squadron. The regiment was assigned to the 2nd Cavalry Division "Emanuele Filiberto Testa di Ferro", which served in annexed Albania, occupied Greece, and occupied Yugoslavia.

During the war the regiment's depot in Ferrara formed the:
 III Armored Group "Lancieri di Firenze"
 III Road Movement Battalion "Lancieri di Firenze"
 VII Dismounted Group "Lancieri di Firenze"
 LVI Dismounted Group "Lancieri di Firenze"

On 15 July 1942 the Firenze's depot in Ferrara formed the Armored Reconnaissance Grouping "Lancieri di Montebello" (8th). After the announcement of the Armistice of Cassibile on 8 September 1943 the Firenze was dissolved by invading German forces in the area of Tirana.

Cold War 
On 21 June 1951 the Armored Cavalry Squadron "Lancieri di Firenze" was formed in Rome and equipped with M8 Greyhound armored cars. The squadron served as the reconnaissance unit of the Armored Division "Pozzuolo del Friuli". In 1955 the squadron moved from Rome to Civitavecchia. On 1 October 1956 the squadron was expanded to Squadrons Group "Lancieri di Firenze". On 31 December 1958 the squadrons group and the Armored Division "Pozzuolo del Friuli" were disbanded.

During the 1975 army reform the army disbanded the regimental level and newly independent battalions were granted for the first time their own flags. On 1 October 1975 the II Squadrons Group of the Regiment "Piemonte Cavalleria" (2nd) in Sgonico was reorganized and renamed 9th Tank Squadrons Group "Lancieri di Firenze". The squadrons group received the name, flag, and traditions of the Regiment "Lancieri di Firenze" (9th) and joined the Armored Brigade "Vittorio Veneto". The squadrons group consisted of a command, a command and services squadron, and three tank squadrons equipped with Leopard 1A2 main battle tanks.

For its conduct and work after the 1976 Friuli earthquake the squadrons group was awarded a Bronze Medal of Army Valour, which was affixed to the squadrons group's flag and added to its coat of arms.

In 1986 the squadrons group was reorganized as 9th Mechanized Squadrons Group "Lancieri di Firenze" and now consisted of a command, a command and services squadron, three mechanized squadrons with M113 armored personnel carriers, and a heavy mortar squadron with M106 mortar carriers with 120mm mod. 63 mortars.

Recent times 
After the end of the Cold War the Italian Army began to draw down its forces and the Vittorio Veneto was one of the first brigades to disband. On 31 July 1991 the brigade was deactivated along with most of its subordinate units. In 1992 the Firenze moved from Sgonico to Grosseto in Tuscany, where it joined the Mechanized Brigade "Friuli". On 10 September 1992 the 9th Mechanized Squadrons Group "Lancieri di Firenze" lost its autonomy and the next day the squadrons group entered the newly formed Regiment "Lancieri di Firenze" (9th). The regiment consisted of a command, a command and services squadron, and a squadrons group with three armored squadrons equipped with wheeled Centauro tank destroyers.

From 1 October 1993 to 19 Januar 1994 the regiment participated with one squadron in the United Nations Operation in Somalia II. On 7 October 1995 the Regiment "Lancieri di Firenze" (9th) was renamed Regiment "Savoia Cavalleria" (3rd) and the flag of the Firenze transferred on 9 October to the Shrine of the Flags in the Vittoriano in Rome.

See also 
 Cavalry Brigade "Pozzuolo del Friuli"

References

Cavalry Regiments of Italy